Caloranaerobacter ferrireducens  is a Gram-negative, thermophilic, anaerobic, iron-reducing and motile bacterium from the genus of Caloranaerobacter which has been isolated from hydrothermal sulfide deposits from the East Pacific Rise.

References 

Clostridiaceae
Bacteria described in 2015
Thermophiles